Aristóteles Picho Martínez (8 March 1957 – 21 December 2013) was a Peruvian actor, director, writer and acting teacher.

Born in Huancayo, Junín Region, Picho studied at the Escuela Nacional Superior de Arte Dramático and began his career in 1983. Picho also taught playwriting at the Pontifical Catholic University of Peru and the University of Lima.

Aristóteles Picho died of a heart attack on 21 December 2013, aged 56, in Lima, Lima Province.

Selected filmography
 The Mouth of the Wolf (1988)
 Alias 'La Gringa' (1991)
 Report on Death (1993)

References

External links

1957 births
2013 deaths
People from Huancayo
Peruvian male television actors
Peruvian male film actors
Peruvian male stage actors
Peruvian film directors
Peruvian male writers
20th-century Peruvian male actors